In addition to the show's regular cast of voice actors, guest stars have been featured on SpongeBob SquarePants, an American animated television series created by marine biologist and animator Stephen Hillenburg for Nickelodeon. SpongeBob SquarePants chronicles the adventures and endeavors of the title character and his various friends in the fictional underwater city of Bikini Bottom. Many of the ideas for the show originated in an unpublished, educational comic book titled The Intertidal Zone, which Hillenburg created in the mid-1980s. He began developing SpongeBob SquarePants into a television series in 1996 upon the cancellation of Rocko's Modern Life, which Hillenburg directed. The pilot episode first aired on Nickelodeon in the United States on May 1, 1999. The show's thirteenth and current season premiered in 2020, and 276 episodes of SpongeBob SquarePants have aired. A series of theatrical films based on the show began in 2004 with The SpongeBob SquarePants Movie.

Guest voices have come from many ranges of professions, including actors, athletes, authors, musicians, and artists. The first credited guest stars were McHale's Navy actors Ernest Borgnine and Tim Conway, who appeared in "Mermaid Man and Barnacle Boy (I)", the show's sixth episode. Borgnine and Conway have since been featured as recurring characters on the show until 2012. Rock band Ghastly Ones were the first guest stars to appear as themselves, appearing for a special musical performance in the first-season episode "Scaredy Pants". Aside from the aforementioned actors, actress Marion Ross has a recurring role as Grandma SquarePants, SpongeBob's grandmother. Borgnine has made the most appearances, guest starring 16 times. Conway has made 15 guest appearances, while Ross has appeared four times, John O'Hurley appeared three times, and John Rhys-Davies has appeared twice. Michael McKean has also appeared twice, voicing different characters.

Hillenburg "deliberately avoided" inviting guest starts onto the show, saying that "we only would cast someone if they came right out of the story." A number of guest stars agreed to appear on the show after being convinced by their children who are SpongeBob SquarePants fans, while others accept because they are fans of the show themselves. Casting associate Sarah Noonan, who is responsible for casting guest stars on the show, has received three Artios Award nominations (with one win) from the Casting Society of America. , there have been 78 guest stars on the show, with this figure rising to 84 if The SpongeBob SquarePants Movie and its sequels are included.

Overview and history
Guest stars have appeared on SpongeBob SquarePants since its first season, in addition to the main cast, consisting of Tom Kenny, Bill Fagerbakke, Rodger Bumpass, Clancy Brown, Mr. Lawrence, Jill Talley, Carolyn Lawrence, Mary Jo Catlett and Lori Alan. Series creator Stephen Hillenburg in point of fact eschewed appearances by celebrities on the show, stating in an early interview, "Honestly, I deliberately avoided that. The Simpsons is a tough act to follow, so I thought it was best not to do what they do," referring to the copious number of The Simpsons guest stars. He added, "But we've had a few exceptions." According to Tom Kenny, main character SpongeBob's voice actor, "One of the things networks always try to push is getting celebrities." He said, "But Steve [Hillenburg] had no interest in that and let them know that in no uncertain terms."

The first guest stars to appear on the show were actors Ernest Borgnine and Tim Conway, reuniting for their first joint TV project in 33 years since the 1960s sitcom McHale's Navy. They appeared as SpongeBob's favorite superheroes, Mermaid Man and Barnacle Boy, respectively. Hillenburg and Derek Drymon, the show's creative director, enjoyed the actors' roles in McHale's Navy, and they already wanted the two to provide the voices of Mermaid Man and Barnacle Boy when they were voice casting. Hillenburg and Drymon directly approached Borgnine and Conway, and the actors both accepted. When coming up for the right voice of Mermaid Man, Borgnine cracked his voice by mistake when he was saying "evil!" He said, "By golly! We started something... and we kept [the voice] in." Rock band Ghastly Ones were the first guest stars to appear as themselves, appearing to perform the song "SpongeBob ScaredyPants" in the first-season episode "Scaredy Pants." Their song was then released in the album SpongeBob SquarePants: Original Theme Highlights in 2001. Actors Jim Jarmusch and John Lurie were the first guest stars to appear in live-action. They appeared as themselves in the first-season episode "Hooky" via stock footage from the television program Fishing with John. According to episode writer Vincent Waller, "Someone made us aware of the footage, and they graciously let us use it." The crew planned to film live-action scenes; however, "the Jarmusch and Lurie addition was a very nice surprise."

Several guest stars have made multiple appearances on the show. Borgnine guest starred in 16 episodes, more than anybody else. He voiced Mermaid Man, until his death in 2012. Following his death, Nickelodeon honored him with a two-hour SpongeBob SquarePants marathon featuring his character. Borgnine had found a renewed fanbase among children through his work on the show. Borgnine's former McHale's Navy co-star Conway has made over 15 guest appearances as Barnacle Boy, Mermaid Man's sidekick. Actress Marion Ross first appeared as Grandma SquarePants in the season two episode "Grandma's Kisses," and has since appeared in three other episodes. Actor John O'Hurley provides the voice of King Neptune, who first appeared in the first-season episode "Neptune's Spatula," while John Rhys-Davies made his first appearance as Man Ray, Mermaid Man and Barnacle Boy's nemesis, in the second-season episode "Mermaid Man and Barnacle Boy III." The two have each reappeared in "The Clash of Triton" and "Mermaid Man and Barnacle Boy V," respectively. Other repeat guest stars include Brad Abrell, Steve Kehela and Frank Welker.

Hillenburg said that "We only would cast someone if they came right out of the story," while Sarah Noonan, vice president of talent and casting for Nickelodeon, said that guest star choices come from the writing staff and executive producer. Writer Steven Banks said, "It's not just stunt casting to get publicity," and that the reasoning is "[we] do want to meet them [...]" A number of guest stars have accepted to appear on the show after being persuaded by their children who are SpongeBob SquarePants fans. Some of them include Victoria Beckham, Amy Poehler and David Hasselhoff. Others accept to guest appear because they are fans of the show themselves. Actor Johnny Depp, who appeared as Jack Kahuna Laguna in the sixth-season episode "SpongeBob SquarePants vs. The Big One," accepted the guest role on the show because he and his children are fans. Hillenburg described the process, "In the beginning, it was hard to get people. Most of the people that allow themselves to be on have kids who like the show. Often, their kids are fans. They're doing it because they want to please the family." SpongeBob SquarePants has a "dream list" of celebrities that the crew would like to appear on the show, which includes actors Michael Caine and Jerry Lewis. Noonan said, "Let us know if you can help us out with them."

Many guest stars record their parts in the show's recording studio, although some are recorded over the telephone. Kenny joked, "With movie stars, sometimes they have to phone it in from their villa in France." When recording over the phone, some guest stars would do their parts in real time with the show's cast who are in the recording studio. Noonan received three Artios Award nominations from the Casting Society of America for her work on casting actors on the show. She was honored in 2011 in the Outstanding Achievement in Casting—Television Animation category. , there have been 78 guest stars, totaling 117 guest spots. These figures rise to 84 and 123 respectively if The SpongeBob SquarePants Movie and The SpongeBob Movie: Sponge Out of Water are included.

Guest stars

Key
 A double dagger denotes recurring guest stars.
 The color of the season number in the first column corresponds to the color of that season's DVD boxset.
 In the No. column:
 The first number refers to the order it aired during the entire series.
 The second number refers to the episode number within its season.

Notes

 A. Bands are counted as a single unit as there is no confirmation of which of the band's members performed in their appearances.
 B. The character puppet was puppeteered and voiced by Robert Smigel.

References

External links
 Episodes cast at the Internet Movie Database

Guest stars
SpongeBob SquarePants guest stars
Lists of guest appearances in television